Bozüyük HSR station, short for Bozüyük High Speed Rail station, ( short for Bozüyük Yüksek Hızlı Tren Garı) is a railway station on the Ankara–Istanbul high-speed railway just south of Bozüyük, Turkey. The station opened on 25 July 2014, along with the Eskişehir-Istanbul portion of the high-speed railway and is for the moment one of three railway stations in Turkey to be dedicated to high-speed rail. Bozüyük YHT has three tracks served by two platforms and two tracks in the middle for passing trains.

Prior to the opening of the high-speed railway, the now indefinitely closed Bozüyük station, located in the center of the town, was serviced by many trains running from Istanbul to Ankara and points beyond. This older railway station is expected to re-open to passenger traffic, once the construction of the Marmaray commuter rail system in Istanbul is finished and Intercity train services resume.

Station Layout

References

External links
Bozüyük YHT station information

Railway stations in Bilecik Province
Bozüyük District
High-speed railway stations in Turkey
Buildings and structures in Bilecik Province
Transport in Bilecik Province
Railway stations opened in 2014
2014 establishments in Turkey